Jörg Schüttauf (born 26 December 1961) is a German actor. He studied at the Theaterhochschule Leipzig. Since 2002 he has starred in the Hessischer Rundfunk version of the popular television crime series Tatort.

Filmography

Film
 1985: Ete und Ali
 1990: Die Architekten
 1992: Lenz
 1996: Viel Spaß mit meiner Frau
 1998: Bis zum Horizont und weiter
 2001: Berlin is in Germany
 2003: September
 2007: Meine schöne Nachbarin
 2008: Wir sind das Volk (als Bernd Hoffmann)
 2009: So glücklich war ich noch nie
 2021: Dear Thomas

Television
 1987: Der Staatsanwalt hat das Wort: Unbefleckte Empfängnis
 1987: Der Staatsanwalt hat das Wort: Unter einem Dach
 1989: Polizeiruf 110: Drei Flaschen Tokajer
 1990: Polizeiruf 110: Tödliche Träume
 1991: Polizeiruf 110: Mit dem Anruf kommt der Tod
 1994–1997: Der Fahnder
 1994: Der große Abgang
 1996: Tatort: Schneefieber
 1997: Viel Spaß mit meiner Frau
 1997: Alte Liebe
 1998: Sperling und das schlafende Mädchen
 1998:  (TV miniseries)
 1999: 
 1999: Ich habe Nein gesagt
 1999: Castor
 1999: Die Cleveren: Gier
 2000: Bella Block: Abschied im Licht
 2001: Liebesau - mitten in Deutschland
 2001: Das Traumschiff: Mexiko
 2002: 
 2002–2010: Tatort (18 episodes as Kommissar Fritz Dellwo)
 Oskar (2002)
 Frauenmorde (2003)
 Das Böse (2003)
 Janus (2004)
 Herzversagen (2004)
 Wo ist Max Gravert? (2005)
 Leerstand (2005)
  (2006)
 Der Tag des Jägers (2006)
 Unter uns (2007)
 Bevor es dunkel wird (2007)
 Der frühe Abschied (2008)
 Waffenschwestern (2008)
 Der tote Chinese (2008)
  (2009)
 Architektur eines Todes (2009)
 Weil sie böse sind (2010)
 Am Ende des Tages (2010)
 2003: Nachbarinnen
 2004: 
 2004: 
 2004: Schlafsack für zwei
 2004: Das Schwalbennest
 2005: Polizeiruf 110: Hoffnung auf Glück
 2005: Die letzte Schlacht
 2005: Arnies Welt
 2006: Tatort: Außer Gefecht
 2007: 
 2007: Nichts ist vergessen
 2008: Die Blücherbande ... Andy Walz
 2009: Das Paradies am Ende der Welt
 2009: Das total verrückte Wochenende
 2011: 
 2015: 
 2018: Bad Banks

References

External links

1961 births
Living people
People from Chemnitz
Theaterhochschule Leipzig alumni
German male television actors
German male film actors
East German actors